Ectoderm-neural cortex protein 1 is a protein that in humans is encoded by the ENC1 gene.

Function 

DNA damage and/or hyperproliferative signals activate wildtype p53 tumor suppressor protein (TP53; MIM 191170), inducing cell cycle arrest or apoptosis. Mutations that inactivate p53 occur in 50% of all tumors. Polyak et al. (1997) used serial analysis of gene expression (SAGE) to evaluate cellular mRNA levels in a colorectal cancer cell line transfected with p53. Of 7,202 transcripts identified, only 14 were expressed at levels more than 10-fold higher in p53-expressing cells than in control cells. Polyak et al. (1997) termed these genes 'p53-induced genes,' or PIGs, several of which were predicted to encode redox-controlling proteins. They noted that reactive oxygen species (ROS) are potent inducers of apoptosis. Flow cytometric analysis showed that p53 expression induces ROS production, which increases as apoptosis progresses under some conditions. The authors stated that the PIG10 gene, also called ENC1, encodes an actin-binding protein.[supplied by OMIM]

Interactions 

ENC1 has been shown to interact with Retinoblastoma protein.

Model organisms
Model organisms have been used in the study of ENC1 function. A conditional knockout mouse line called Enc1tm1a(EUCOMM)Wtsi was generated at the Wellcome Trust Sanger Institute. Male and female animals underwent a standardized phenotypic screen to determine the effects of deletion. Additional screens performed:  - In-depth immunological phenotyping

References

Further reading 

 
 
 
 
 
 
 
 
 

Kelch proteins